Tamás Sipos (born 6 March 1988 in Nyíregyháza) is a Hungarian football player who currently plays for Balmazújvárosi FC.

References 
HLSZ
Lombard FC Papa Official Website
UEFA Official Website

1988 births
Living people
People from Nyíregyháza
Hungarian footballers
Association football defenders
Nyíregyháza Spartacus FC players
Tuzsér SE footballers
Lombard-Pápa TFC footballers
Bőcs KSC footballers
Balmazújvárosi FC players
Sportspeople from Szabolcs-Szatmár-Bereg County